Lauren Susan Green (born June 30, 1958) is the Chief Religion Correspondent for Fox News. Previously she was a headline anchor giving weekday updates at the top and bottom of the hour during morning television show Fox & Friends. She has also appeared as a guest panelist on Fox's late-night satire show Red Eye w/ Greg Gutfeld. She is the first African-American Miss Minnesota.

Early life
Green was born to Robert and Bessie Grissam Green in Minneapolis. She has two sisters, Barbara and Lois, and two brothers, Leslie and Kenneth.  In an interview with Bill O'Reilly she admitted that when she was in the sixth grade, Prince had a crush on her, called her to say "I like you", and she hung up on him. She later appeared in the music video for Prince's 1992 song My Name Is Prince, playing a news anchor and using her own name of Lauren Green. She won the Miss Minnesota pageant in 1984, and was third runner-up in the Miss America 1985 pageant.

Green earned her Bachelor of Music in piano performance from the University of Minnesota in 1980, then attended graduate school at the Medill School of Journalism at Northwestern University.

Green is a practicing Christian and was raised in the African Methodist Episcopal Church.

Interview with Reza Aslan
In 2011, Green asked whether Islam "makes believers more susceptible to radicalization." After a 2013 interview with Iranian-American scholar Reza Aslan (who was then promoting his new book, Zealot: The Life and Times of Jesus of Nazareth), she received considerable criticism for her questions. Green questioned why a Muslim would write about Jesus, saying, "You're a Muslim, so why did you write a book about the founder of Christianity?" Aslan defended his credentials several times throughout, and clearly stated that his interest was scholarly.  Green continued to press him on the same matters, clearly not taking on board anything Aslan said.

Erik Wemple of The Washington Post disparaged Green's questions as "dumb, loaded, and prejudicial," calling for the Fox News Channel to apologize to Aslan. Daniel Politi of Slate speculated that the interview was possibly "the single most cringe-worthy, embarrassing interview on Fox News [...] in recent memory." Matthew J. Franck criticized Aslan for his claim of a degree in the history of religions, as he teaches creative writing and holds a PhD in Sociology of Religion rather than a degree in history.  In the interview, Aslan clearly stated that "anyone who thinks this book is an attack on Christianity has not read it yet."

Music
In 2004, Green released an album called Classic Beauty consisting of classical piano music.

Green also played keyboards for Mike Huckabee's band The Little Rockers on the Fox News program Huckabee.

In January 2014 Green performed in the 90th birthday concert for Georg Ratzinger, the brother of Pope Emeritus Benedict XVI, who was also in attendance. She described this in an opinion piece written for Fox News as "the honor of a lifetime."

COVID-19 pandemic
Throughout the COVID-19 pandemic, Green advocated for churches who defied court orders to stop large gatherings. An editorial written by her, and published by Fox News on March 15 featured a stock photo of people holding hands when CDC guidelines at the time advised against it. The article called washing hands, sanitizing homes, and practicing social distancing a "temporary or flimsy barrier to a raging tsunami" and said "To close the churches where people go for comfort and spiritual strength – as an act of fighting against this biological scourge – seems like a surrender to Satan."

Green interviewed Louisiana pastor Tony Spell for a Fox News piece in which she argued that "The fundamental right to freedom of religion in the United States is sacrosanct." In Green's piece Spell claimed the church closings were politically motivated, and that through faith his church members had been "healed of HIV and cancer -- diseases [that are] bigger than COVID-19."

References

External links 
 Lauren Green at Facebook

1958 births
African-American classical pianists
African-American television personalities
American classical pianists
American women classical pianists
American television reporters and correspondents
Fox News people
Living people
Medill School of Journalism alumni
Miss America 1980s delegates
Miss America Preliminary Talent winners
People from Minneapolis
University of Minnesota College of Liberal Arts alumni
African-American Christians
People of the African Methodist Episcopal church
20th-century American pianists
20th-century American women pianists
21st-century classical pianists
American women television journalists
21st-century American women pianists
21st-century American pianists
African-American women musicians